The Holidays EP is the first official release by the Australian indie band The Holidays. It was released on 19 April 2008. The lead single off the EP was "Holiday" which received high rotation on the national youth radio station, Triple J.

Track listing 
"Holiday"
"Planes"
"The Lovers"
"Telephone"
"The Werewolf You Become"

References

External links 
 
 The Holidays Myspace
 Liberation Music

2008 EPs
The Holidays albums